The Bayer designation Rho Arietis (ρ Arietis, abbreviated to ρ Ari) is shared by three stars in the constellation of Aries:

 ρ¹ Arietis (44 Arietis), an A-type main sequence star. 
 ρ² Arietis (45 Arietis), an M-type giant star.
 ρ³ Arietis (46 Arietis), an F-type main sequence star.

In some instances, ρ³ Arietis is called simply ρ Arietis.

Arietis, Rho
Aries (constellation)